Gonzalo Alvarado Cornejo was a Peruvian weightlifter. He competed in the men's lightweight event at the 1948 Summer Olympics.

References

External links
 

Year of birth missing
Possibly living people
Peruvian male weightlifters
Olympic weightlifters of Peru
Weightlifters at the 1948 Summer Olympics
Place of birth missing
20th-century Peruvian people